Bruce Dellis is an American film director and screenwriter based in Tempe, AZ. He has written and directed several award-winning short films and features.

Career
In 2006, Dellis won two Rocky Mountain Emmy Awards for The Intervention of Brad. That same year, he was named Arizona Filmmaker of the Year by the Phoenix Film Foundation.

In 2007, he wrote the feature-length film Netherbeast Incorporated, which premiered at the 2007 AFI/Dallas Film Festival. The offbeat comedy stars Darrell Hammond, Judd Nelson, Robert Wagner, Jason Mewes, Dave Foley, Steve Burns, and Amy Davidson.

Dellis won two more Rocky Mountain Emmy Awards in 2008 for his offbeat short film on the PTA called Fuller PTA: Better Than Stepping on a Rusty Nail.

In all, Dellis has been nominated for a total of 14 Rocky Mountain Emmys, winning five.

Dellis wrote and directed a chapter of the anthology film Locker 13. The chapter, titled "The Benevolent Byzantine Order of the Nobles of the Enigmatic Oracle", stars David Huddleston, Bart Johnson, and Curtis Armstrong. Locker 13 was released in 2014.

In 2019, Dellis wrote and directed "Raising Buchanan," a feature film starring René Auberjonois, Amanda Melby, M. Emmet Walsh, Cathy Shim, Terence Bernie Hines, and Robert Ben Garant. It concerns a woman who steals the body of President James Buchanan with the hope of ransoming him for a large payoff, but finds that no one is particularly interested in getting him back. The film has won several awards on the film festival circuit.

Filmography

Films

Personal life
Dellis is a faculty associate at Arizona State University teaching screenwriting. He is married with one child.

External links

References

American male screenwriters
People from Tempe, Arizona
Living people
Film directors from Arizona
Screenwriters from Arizona
Year of birth missing (living people)